WPCA-LP is an Adult Standards, Middle of the Road, and Jazz formatted broadcast radio station licensed to and serving Amery, Wisconsin.  WPCA-LP is owned and operated by Dream Center, Inc.

References

External links
 WPCA Radio Online
 

2003 establishments in Wisconsin
Adult standards radio stations in the United States
Jazz radio stations in the United States
Radio stations established in 2003
PCA-LP
PCA-LP
Polk County, Wisconsin